"Nobody to Love" is a song by British record production duo Sigma. The song was originally a bootleg remix of "Bound 2" by Kanye West featuring Charlie Wilson, released on 24 January 2014 as a free download. It later received support from major British radio stations including BBC Radio 1 and 1Xtra, and so was reworked into an original track with Wilson's vocals covered by former One True Voice member Daniel Pearce. It was released as the second single from their debut studio album, Life (2015).

The song topped the UK Singles Chart upon release, making it not only Sigma's first UK number one but also their first ever top 40 single. It sold over 121,000 copies in the first week. It also topped the charts in Poland, Scotland and New Zealand. In New Zealand, after falling out of the chart after three weeks, it returned to the chart the following week and went straight to number one. The song also reached the top 3 in Belgium and Ireland and number 11 in Australia.

Background and composition
"Nobody to Love" was originally a bootleg remix of American rapper Kanye West's 2013 single "Bound 2", featuring Charlie Wilson. Sigma frequently played the remix in nightclubs around the UK and received positive feedback. The remix was released on 24 January 2014 as a free download and, after the duo sent it to some DJs at BBC Radio 1, they "got really behind it" and record labels later started approaching Sigma. This led them to rework it into an original song, with Wilson's vocals covered by former One True Voice member Daniel Pearce. The beginning of the song's original mix samples "Think (About It)" by Lyn Collins. The female voice saying "uh huh, honey" is a sample of "Sweet Nothin's" performed by Brenda Lee.

The song is composed in the key of E-flat major, and it has a fast tempo of 175 BPM, due to the genre being drum and bass.

Music video
A music video to accompany the release of "Nobody to Love" was directed by Craig Moore and was filmed in Cape Town, South Africa. It was first released onto YouTube on 24 March 2014 at a total length of four minutes and four seconds. The video features South African models Liv de Klerk and Nicole Naude on a road trip, described as "Thelma and Louise reinvented". As of October 2022, the video has received over 276 million views.

Track listing

Credits and personnel
Songwriting – Kanye West, John Stephens, Charlie Wilson, Che Pope, Elon Rutberg, Cydel Young, Malik Jones, Sakiya Sandifer, Mike Dean, Norman Whiteside, Bob Massey, Robert Dukes, Ronnie Self
Production and keyboards – Cameron Edwards, Joe Lenzie
Additional programming and keyboards – Hal Ritson, Richard Adlam
Vocals – Daniel Pearce
Backing vocals – Yolanda Quartey

Credits adapted from CD single liner notes.

Charts and certifications

Weekly charts

Year-end charts

Certifications

Release history

References

2014 singles
2014 songs
Sigma songs
Number-one singles in New Zealand
Number-one singles in Poland
Number-one singles in Scotland
UK Singles Chart number-one singles
Songs about loneliness
Songs written by Kanye West
Songs written by John Legend
Songs written by Charlie Wilson (singer)
Songs written by Ronnie Self
3 Beat Records singles